"Carpe Diem" is a song by Slovene pop rock band Joker Out, released on 4 February 2023.

Production and release 
Recording for the song took place within the month of December 2022 in a Hamburg, Germany studio over a 12-day period, according to an Instagram post that the band had posted. The band had stated that they had wanted to keep the entire song in the Slovene language, saying that "we want to translate Slovenian into a universal language of dance and entertainment that all countries understand." In January 2023, the band would film their music video, shot in Slovenia's capital, Ljubljana at the Grand Hotel Union.

Eurovision Song Contest

At Eurovision 
According to Eurovision rules, all nations with the exceptions of the host country and the "Big Five" (France, Germany, Italy, Spain and the United Kingdom) are required to qualify from one of two semi-finals in order to compete for the final; the top ten countries from each semi-final progress to the final. The European Broadcasting Union (EBU) split up the competing countries into six different pots based on voting patterns from previous contests, with countries with favourable voting histories put into the same pot. On 31 January 2023, an allocation draw was held which placed each country into one of the two semi-finals, as well as which half of the show they would perform in. Slovenia has been placed into the second semi-final, to be held on 11 May 2023, and has been scheduled to perform in the second half of the show.

References 

2023 songs
2023 singles
Eurovision songs of Slovenia
Eurovision songs of 2023